Philotheca ciliata is a species of flowering plant in the family Rutaceae and is endemic to inland New South Wales and Queensland. It is a shrub with small, more or less cylindrical leaves and white flowers arranged singly or in two or threes on the ends of branchlets.

Description
The ten stamens are joined in the lower part and hairy above. Flowering has been occurs from August to November and the fruit has tufts of hairs on the end.

Taxonomy and naming
Philotheca ciliata was first formally described in 1848 by William Jackson Hooker in Thomas Mitchell's Journal of an Expedition into the Interior of Tropical Australia.

Distribution and habitat
This philotheca grows in woodland and mallee and is found in inland south-east Queensland and in New South Wales near West Wyalong and the northern Pilliga Scrub.

Conservation status
This species is classified as of "least concern" under the Queensland Government Nature Conservation Act 1992.

References

ciliata
Flora of New South Wales
Flora of Queensland
Sapindales of Australia
Plants described in 1848
Taxa named by William Jackson Hooker